The President of the National Assembly is the presiding officer (speaker) of the National Assembly of Thailand. Since 1997, the office has been an ex officio position occupied by the Speaker of the House of Representatives of Thailand. The President is therefore an MP, usually from the majority party in the House of Representatives. The President is elected at the beginning of a House session immediately after an election, there are no term limits for the office. In the aftermath of the Coup d'état in 2014, the function of legislative assembly was turned over to the junta-controlled National Legislative Assembly, which Pornpetch Wichitcholchai, President of the National Legislative Assembly, is occupying ex officio position of President of the National Assembly.

The office of the President of the National Assembly was first established in 1932, with the establishment of the first legislature of Thailand. The office of the President of the People's Assembly of Siam was first occupied by Chaophraya Thammasakmontri (Sanan Thephasadin na Ayutthaya).

Powers and functions

As President
The President of the National Assembly, apart from being the presiding officer of the National Assembly whenever there is a joint-sitting, is also the chief representative and leader of the legislative branch in Thailand. In the 2007 constitution the President of the National Assembly is given many powers. The President is assisted by the Vice President of the National Assembly, another ex officio position occupied by the President of the Senate.
 Countersign the King's appointment and removal of the President of the Privy Council and Regent of Thailand.
 Countersign the Royal Command for the amendment of the 1924 Palace Law of Succession.
 Inviting the Heir to ascend the Throne.
 Ensure all votes in the Assembly is recorded.
 Asking the Monarch to convoke an extraordinary session of the Assembly.

As Speaker
The Speaker of the House of Representatives is the chief presiding officer of the House of Representatives. The Speaker is also entrusted with some legislative powers, as it is his main role to ensure all the legislative process is followed. The Speaker is assisted by two Deputy Speakers. The Speaker must act impartially on all matters and therefore cannot be a member of an executive committee of a political party, this also apply to his deputies.
 Filling a vacancy of a Party list MP, by submitting a name on the list for publication in the Royal Gazette.
 Submitting to the King the name of the Prime Minister-elect to be formally appointed, then countersigning it.
 Countersign the King's appointment of the Leader of the Opposition.
 Be an ex officio member of the Selection committee for:
 Constitutional Court Judges
 Election Commissioners
 Ombudsmen
 National Anti-Corruption Commissioners

List of presidents
Note: According to the 2007 Constitution of Thailand the office of President of the National Assembly of Thailand is held as an ex officio position by the Speaker of the House of Representatives. However throughout Thailand's long constitutional history this has not always been the case, at certain times the office of 'President' of the legislature was sometimes held by the presiding officer of the upper house or that of a unicameral chamber.

See also
 National Assembly of Thailand
 Senate of Thailand
 House of Representatives of Thailand
 List of presidents of the Senate of Thailand
 List of speakers of the House of Representatives of Thailand

References

 Parliament of Thailand
 https://web.archive.org/web/20080629062600/http://phetchaburi.ect.go.th/news/1.1.1.htm
 https://web.archive.org/web/20080618030359/http://www.rakbankerd.com/01_jam/thaiinfor/country_info/index.html?topic_id=87&db_file=
 http://rulers.org/thaigov.html

Government of Thailand
Political history of Thailand
 
Chairs of lower houses